George Eric McLaren (22 March 1925 – 23 July 1956) was an Australian rules footballer who played for Footscray in the Victorian Football League (VFL) during the 1940s and early 1950s.

A wingman, McLaren was recruited from the Essendon District League. He started out at Footscray in 1944 and two years later represented Victoria in an interstate match against South Australia. In the 1951 season, his last, McLaren filled in as coach for a game against Richmond which they won by 26 points.

McLaren was killed in a car accident in 1956.

References

George McLaren's coaching statistics at AFL Tables
Holmesby, Russell and Main, Jim (2007). The Encyclopedia of AFL Footballers. 7th ed. Melbourne: Bas Publishing.

1925 births
Australian rules footballers from Victoria (Australia)
Western Bulldogs players
Western Bulldogs coaches
Road incident deaths in Victoria (Australia)
1956 deaths